Sir Thomas Teddeman († 13 May 1668 Old Style) was an English admiral of the 17th century. His name was also written as Teddiman, Tyddiman or Teddyman.

The early career of Thomas Teddeman is unknown; he was not a naval captain during the First Anglo-Dutch War. He was the namesake of his father, who descended from a family of ship-owners in Dover. His cousin was the naval captain Henry Teddeman.

Teddeman, first serving the English Commonwealth, commanded from 1659 till 1660 the Tredagh (after the English Restoration renamed to ) in the Mediterranean during the Anglo-Spanish War. From 31 May till 10 June 1660 he chased six Spanish vessels he encountered off Algiers. In 1665, during the Second Anglo-Dutch War, he distinguished himself as rear admiral of the Blue Squadron in the Battle of Lowestoft, with as flagship the new second rate , and was knighted on 30 June (Old Style).

In August 1665 Teddeman was sent on the Revenge to Bergen to capture a Dutch treasure fleet with a flotilla of frigates but was defeated in the Battle of Vågen by Commandeur Pieter de Bitter. Though this was a major disappointment to Charles II of England, Teddeman's career did not suffer much and he fought, again on the Katherine, the next year as vice admiral of the Blue in the Four Days Battle and as vice-admiral of the White in the St James's Day Battle. In 1667 Teddeman had no command, the main vessels of the English fleet having been laid up. On 13 May he died from a fever caused by a thrush in the mouth.

Literature
R.C. Anderson, 1964, List of English Naval Captains 1642–1660

Royal Navy vice admirals
Royal Navy personnel of the Second Anglo-Dutch War
1668 deaths
Year of birth missing